Nurmon Jymy is a pesäpalloclub in Seinäjoen Nurmossa. Nurmo is Nurmo is a former municipality of Finland and now part of Seinäjoki. Nurmon Jymy's primary team played in the professional division in Finland Superpesiksessä until 2012 and their secondary team played in the national league.
After the 2011 season Nurmon Jymy came together with Seinäjoen Maila-Jussit and formed Jymy-Jussit this team then entered the professional baseball division Superpesis.
The club plays its home games in Hyllykallio in their home field Skaala-areena. The club reached its audience record in 2005 in the final match against Kiteen Pallo -90. The estimated number of viewers is about 4290 people. In 2005 the team won silver in Superpesis, 2006 they achieved 5th and 4th in 2007.

History 

Nurmon Jymy was established 5 March 1925. The name Jymy was selected from an extensive list of possible names. When established junior teams Ylipään Kaverir and Alapään Koitto merged. The reason behind this was the shortage of funds of the two teams. The merging was done by many significant personnel, such as Kustaa Pihlajamäki and Kyösti Luukko. The first chairman of team was Viljo Peltola. The city of Nurmo had been interested in baseball like sports for a long time. The citizens of Nurmo use to play sports in the Civil Guard( White Civil Guard) and in 1924 they won the championship of the district in pesäpallo.

Hall of Fame

Awarded

East-West -players

 Jussi Kitinoja (1951, 1955, 1956, 1958)
 Sakari Mannila (1956)
 Kustaa Rasku (1956, 1958, 1961)
 Esa Risku (1961, 1962)
 Taisto Tikkanen (1966)
 Aulis Paski (1967)
 Martti Yli-Jaskari (1967)
 Mauno Yli-Soini (1970)
 Jouko Martikkala (1976)
 Markku Haapasalmi (1977)
 Erkki Lahti (1985)
 Antti Piuhola (2004)
 Antti Kataja-Rahko (2004)
 Teijo Kankaanpää (2004, 2005)
 Mikko Vainionpää (2005)
 Antti Tokkari (2005, 2006)
 Antti Kuusisto (2005, 2006, 2007, 2008)
 Henri Puputti (2005, 2006, 2007, 2008)
 Tommi Murto (2006)
 Henri Heinäheimo (2008)
 Juha Niemi (2010)

Organization 
Nurmon Jymyn pesäpallotoiminnasta vastaa Nurmon Jymy ry:n pesäpallojaosto. Pesäpallojaoston puheenjohtajana toimii kaudella 2010 Heikki Riikilä.

Budget 
In 2007 the primary team had a budget €367 000 . In 2006 the budget was €358 000 . In 2005 the budget was 307 000 euroa. In 2008 budget was 10 000 ja and target audience number was 75. In total Nurmon Jymy had a budget of 400 000 and the pesäpallo(baseball team) took 350 000 euroa. In 2009 the organization total budget was 389 000, the pesäpallo team took 166 000 euroa.

Standings and rankings

Achievements 
Nurmon Jymy has achieved 3 medals in the professional league, of those three two were bronze and one silver. The bronze medals were achieved in 1956 and 2008. Silver medal was achieved in 2005.  The team won Pesäpallon Suomen Cup in 1978. The team has won 4 medals in indoor pesäpallo which has some modified rules. They won silver in 2004 and 2005 and bronze in 2006 and 2007.

Game Masters

 1950-luku Erkki Kurikka
 1960-luku Veikko Lahti
 1964 Kustaa Rasku
 1965 Juho Niemistö
 1970-luku Veikko Lahti, Markku Latikka
 1976 Veikko Lahti
 1977–1978 Esa Risku
 1979–1981 Raimo Rajala
 1982–1983 Oiva Lilli
 1984 Tuomo Olli
 1985 Jouko Martikkala
 1986 Kari Kiiskilä
 1987 Tuomo Olli
 1988–1989 Juhani Kukkasela
 1990 Oiva Lilli
 1991–1993 Veikko Puiras
 1994–1995 Risto Ojanperä
 2000–2001 Marko Hakala
 2002–2003 Pasi Tyynelä
 2004 Mauri Pyhälahti
 2005–2008 Jussi Järvinen
 2009 Jari Mäkelä, 8.7 alkaen Jussi Järvinen
 2010–2011 Antti Piuhola
 2012– Jarmo Ania

Seasons in different leagues

Men

Selitteet
 Kausien 1933–1935 sijoitus kertoo Jymyn sijoituksen omassa lohkossaan, ei koko B-ryhmässä.

References

  Nurmon historia III s.6
  Nurmon historia III s.52
  Nurmon historia III s.40
  Nurmon historia III s.83
  http://www.vessix.kotisivukone.com/files/vessix.kotisivukone.com/Pesis/1931/1931-sarjat.xls
  a bhttp://www.vessix.kotisivukone.com/files/vessix.kotisivukone.com/Pesis/seurat/nurmon_jymy.xls
  http://www.mrasilainen.com/sarjat/1931/1932_ka.htm
  http://www.vessix.kotisivukone.com/files/vessix.kotisivukone.com/Pesis/1933/1933-sarjat.xls
  http://www.vessix.kotisivukone.com/files/vessix.kotisivukone.com/Pesis/1934/1934-sarjat.xls
  http://www.vessix.kotisivukone.com/files/vessix.kotisivukone.com/Pesis/1935/1935-sarjat.xls
  Nurmon historia III s.86
  http://www.vessix.kotisivukone.com/files/vessix.kotisivukone.com/Pesis/1939/1939-sarjat.xls
  Nurmon historia III s.103
  http://www.mrasilainen.com/sarjat/ottelut/M_Suomensarja_1945-2008.xls 
  Nurmon historia III s.160
  Nurmon historia III s.156–157
  http://www.mrasilainen.com/scripts/W_IL_seura.php?jid=59
  http://www.mrasilainen.com/sarjat/ottelut/M_Suomensarja_1945-2008.xls 
  http://www.mrasilainen.com/sarjat/ottelut/M_Suomensarja_1945-2008.xls 
  Nurmon historia III s.157
  Nurmon historia III s.157
  http://www.pesis.fi/mp/db/file_library/x/IMG/36858/file/msu1955.txt 
  Nurmon historia III s.306
  Nurmon historia III s.162
  Nurmon historia III s.161
  Urheilumme kasvot 3: Palloilu, s. 1107. Pesäpallo: Lukkarit, Lyöjäkuninkaat. Jyväskylä: Oy Scandia kirjat Ab, 1973.
  http://www.mrasilainen.com/scripts/W_IL_seura.php?jid=59
  http://www.mrasilainen.com/sarjat/ottelut/M_SM_1922-2008.xls
  Nurmon historia III s.164
  Nurmon historia III s.157
  Sanomalehti Karjalainen: Lehti: Nurmon Jymyn kausi vaarassa
  http://2007.kipa90.com/main.site?action=siteupdate/view&id=82 
  http://2007.kipa90.com/main.site?action=news/view&id=354&ngid=1 
  http://2007.kipa90.com/main.site?action=news/view&id=230&ngid=1 
 www.pesis.fi/mp/db/file_library/x/IMG/42780/file/Miestensuomensarjanennakko2008.pdf
  http://www.ilkka.fi/arc_article.jsp?article=328111
 http://yle.fi/urheilu/lajit/pesapallo/2009/05/nurmo_rakentaa_uutta_jymya_146204.htmlNurmo rakentaa uutta Jymyä
  SUOMEN SUURIN PESISJOUKKUE ! Jymy. Viitattu 4 March 2008.
  Nurmon historia III s.157
  Jymyläinen 2/2008 24 September 2008 s.1

External links 
 Nurmon Jymyn pesäpallon kotisivut

Pesäpallo